is a horror novel by Japanese writer Koji Suzuki, and the third in his series of Ring.

The story revolves around a simulated reality, exactly the same as our own, known as the Loop: created to simulate the emergence and evolution of life. It is in this alternate universe that the events of the previous novels, Ring and Spiral took place. 

Loop is the only book in the series to have not been the basis of any Ring films.

Plot
The story revolves around a medical student named Kaoru Futami. His father, Hideyuki, contracts a deadly disease known as Metastatic Human Cancer (MHC), a terminal cancer that affects all forms of organic life: humans, animals and plants. Events lead Hideyuki to tell Kaoru more about a research program he was involved in called the LOOP project: a virtual reality simulator which is meant to represent the emergence of life and how the world most likely evolved. It is known that almost everyone who was involved in the LOOP project has died of the same cancer.

Kaoru takes a part-time job tutoring a boy named Ryoji, who is an asymptomatic carrier of MHC along with his mother, Reiko. Despite her being fifteen years his senior, Kaoru falls in love with Reiko. Eventually, they begin an affair once Ryoji begins chemotherapy. When he finds out, Ryoji commits suicide by falling backwards out of a twelve-story building. About a month afterwards, Kaoru learns from Reiko that she may be pregnant with Kaoru's child. He also reads Ryoji's suicide note, in which he explains his motivation for taking his own life.

As Kaoru continues his investigation into the LOOP project, his father asks him to meet a microbiologist named Amano, was involved in the final stages of LOOP before it was scrapped. Amano reveals that LOOP utilized a hundred supercomputers strung together with the aim to recreate life, and tells Kaoru of a scientist in New Mexico who might still be alive. During this period he also finds out that the MHC cells all equal 2n X 3. Kaoru's mother, Machiko, convinces him to go to New Mexico after relating a tale of the "Ancient One" who has a thousand eyes watching.

Kaoru then ventures to New Mexico, only to find the scientist dead. However, inside the scientist's lab, the computer turns itself on and tells Kaoru to put on a pair of virtual reality goggles and gloves, which brings him into the LOOP simulation. Kaoru experiences a Native American's life who has a wife and two children and is brutally murdered by white colonisers. Coming out of the simulation, Kaoru calls Amano and asks for the coordinates of the events that are crucial to the LOOP evolution: the lives of Asakawa, Takayama and Yamamura. Amano pinpoints the exact coordinates of the events that take place. He also explains how Kaoru can either merge consciousness with people in LOOP or that he watch from afar like a ghost. He then finds out, in complete detail, events from the previous novels navigating from different angles. First he looks at things from Ryuji's eyes, then Asakawa, finally settling on a character named Ando who finds out the truth about Sadako.

Soon after that, he has another discussion with Amano, who knows that the LOOP's creator had intentions to recreate Ryuji's death. By doing so, he could create a clone and insert him into a woman's womb. But what they forgot is that Ryuji's clone would carry the Ring Virus with his genes. Therefore, when Ryuji was reborn, the virus escaped and mutated into the MHC virus.

Desperate to find the cure for the MHC virus, Kaoru ventures deeper west into the desert only to encounter a storm that leaves him on the verge of death. He is then saved by an old man named Eliot who has purposefully crafted all the events to bring Kaoru to him. After essentially resurrecting Kaoru, the man explains what has happened, and that, Kaoru is Ryuji's clone. As a result, Kaoru has an exceptional gift of immunity to the MHC virus. In order to stop the virus from destroying the real world, Kaoru is essentially sent back to the LOOP world as the one who solves (and eventually stops) the Ring virus. One of the main problems is that he cannot come back to the real world to see his father (still in the hospital) or Reiko ever again. In order to save them, he agrees.

Upon accepting, the old man transfers Kaoru's analyzed molecules into the LOOP where he promises that Reiko can see him. In the LOOP, Kaoru solves the problem with the help of Ando. He watches Ando's resurrected son play in the water. Once Ando leaves, Kaoru looks up at the stars wondering about Reiko.

See also
 Simulated reality
 Simulated reality in fiction
 Horror Fiction
 Gothic Fiction
 Japanese Literature
 Ring

References

External links
 SaruDama - contains reviews of Loop and other Suzuki novels.
  - contains a detailed looked at the character Sadako Yamamura in the films as well as the novels.

The Ring (franchise)
Japanese horror novels
Japanese science fiction novels
Novels by Koji Suzuki
1998 Japanese novels
Novels about virtual reality
Novels about cloning
Fiction about resurrection
Science fiction horror novels